Dereköy (also: Dere) is a village in the Suluova District, Amasya Province, Turkey. Its population is 193 (2021).

References

Villages in Suluova District